Gerald Leon Beverly (born November 18, 1993) is an American professional basketball player for Iwate Big Bulls of the Japanese B3 League. He played college basketball for the Daemen Wildcats.

College career
Beverly played four seasons at Daemen College. In 120 career games for the Wildcats, he averaged 15.0 points on .667 shooting with 8.4 rebounds in 25.3 minutes per game.

Professional career
After going undrafted in the 2015 NBA draft, Beverly signed with Telekom Baskets Bonn of the Basketball Bundesliga, appearing in eight games for them.

On October 30, Beverly was selected by the Los Angeles D-Fenders in the third round of the 2016 NBA Development League draft, but was waived on November 10. Six days later, he was acquired by the Canton Charge making his debut two days later in a 127–121 loss to the Grand Rapids Drive, recording 10 points, nine rebounds, one steal and two blocks in 25 minutes off the bench.

On August 29, 2017, Beverly signed with the Israeli team Maccabi Rishon LeZion for the 2017–18 season. However, he was later waived by Rishon LeZion on October 2 after appearing in one game.

On March 28, 2018, Liège Basket of the EuroMillions Basketball League announced they had signed Beverly for the remainder of the season.

On July 12, 2018, Beverly signed a deal with the Italian club Basket Brescia Leonessa.

References

External links
 Eurocup Profile
 German BBL Profile
 Eurobasket.com Profile
 Daemen Wildcats bio
NBL G league player profile
REALGM.com profile
Basketball-reference.com stats

1993 births
Living people
American expatriate basketball people in Germany
American expatriate basketball people in Israel
American expatriate basketball people in Italy
American men's basketball players
Basket Brescia Leonessa players
Basketball players from New York (state)
Canton Charge players
Daemen Wildcats men's basketball players
Iwate Big Bulls players
Lega Basket Serie A players
Liège Basket players
Rizing Zephyr Fukuoka players
Small forwards
Sportspeople from Rochester, New York
Telekom Baskets Bonn players